Mario Luis Kreutzberger Blumenfeld (born 28 December 1940), better known by his stage name as Don Francisco, is a Chilean television host, and a popular personality on the Univision network reaching Spanish-speaking viewers in the United States. In 2016, he signed into Telemundo. He is best known for hosting the former variety shows Sábado Gigante and Don Francisco Presenta.

Biography
Mario Luis Kreutzberger Blumenfeld was born in Talca, Chile 28 December 1940, to Anna Blumenfeld Neufeld and Erick Kreutzberger, of German Jewish ancestry who fled to Chile to escape from World War II. He is of the Jewish faith.

Career
Kreutzberger started a TV show in 1962, and he named it Show Dominical ("Sunday's Show") on Canal 13; the program's broadcasts were subsequently moved to Saturdays, and henceforth, was renamed Sábados Gigantes. In it, he adapted many of the formulas he had seen in American television to the Chilean public. The show became an instant hit that had lasted over 53 years. In 1986, the show began to be produced by SIN in Miami, Florida, with the same formula used in Chile, with the slightly different name of Sábado Gigante to KMEX-DT channel 34 Los Angeles.

For the next six years, Kreutzberger developed a three-hour-long variety show, including contests, comedy, interviews and a traveling camera section. The traveling camera, or Cámara Viajera (originally La Película Extranjera, The Foreign Movie), has taken "Don Francisco" to over 185 countries worldwide, many of them more than once. Kreutzberger in his show has interviewed many celebrities, including Roberto Durán, Cristina Saralegui, Sussan Taunton, Charytín, Bill Clinton, George W. Bush, Barack Obama, Bill Gates and many others. Through a talent partnership with Memo Flores of Jugaremos en Familia, Sabado Gigante has helped launch the careers of many famous entertainers, such as Lili Estefan, Sissi Fleitas, and numerous more. Kreutzberger appeared as himself in the movie The 33, about the 2010 Copiapó mining accident.

Immediately after the 1973 Chilean coup d'état the military sought after Kreutzberger. They took him to the vandalized house of Salvador Allende, where corpses of guards were still on the floor. The soldiers asked him to report on the events. Kreutzberger declined the offer, encouraging the captain who had approached him to take the role of reporter himself.

Television career
Kreutzberger has also hosted Chilean versions of ¿Quién merece ser millonario? (which is based on the original British format of the international Who Wants to Be a Millionaire? franchise), Deal or No Deal, and Atrapa los Millones (which is based on the American format of the international Money Drop franchise). He hosted the first three seasons of Atrapa los Millones before retiring from the program in 2014; Diana Bolocco became the host for the program's fourth season in 2015, and would eventually remain with the show until its cancellation.

He voiced Governor Bernardo de Galvez in a 2003 episode, "The Great Galvez", of a PBS Kids show Liberty's Kids.

In 2012, Sabado Gigante celebrated 50 years on air.

On 18 April 2015, Don Francisco announced his show would come to an end in September after 53 years on air; Sábado Gigante aired its final episode called "Hasta Siempre" on 19 September 2015.

On 1 March 2016, Don Francisco announced his return to the television and signed a multi-year deal with Telemundo. His first show on the network titled Don Francisco Te Invita, a Sunday night talk show considered to be a spiritual successor to both Don Francisco Presenta and Sábado Gigante, debuted on 9 October 2016. The Telemundo show was canceled in late 2018 after the airing of 100 episodes.

False death reports
On April Fool's Day, 2003, a rumor arose that Kreutzberger had died, the rumor appearing around the New York and New Jersey area. The rumor proved false, but distressed many of his fans until it was revealed as an April Fool's joke.

Eventually rumors were clarified.

Personal life
Kreutzberger promoted and hosted the Teletón, a TV charity show for disabled Chilean children between 1978 and 2021; there have been 22 telethons over 30 years. He is also the Hispanic spokesperson for the U.S. Muscular Dystrophy Association, in which he also appears in a pre-recorded piece on its annual telethon, to appeal to Hispanics to donate. He retired from hosting the show in 2021, at the end of that year's airing of the program.

Kreutzberger was also the first host of the Teletón USA telethon, which was introduced in December 2012 on the Univision network; the event and charity is based on the popular Teleton (Chile) the Chilean Teleton.

Honors
His show was in world's longest running TV variety show, according to Guinness World Records.

Kreutzberger has received numerous awards and a star on the Hollywood Walk of Fame (on 7018 Hollywood Blvd.).

On 1 March 2012, Kreutzberger was inducted into the Television Academy Hall of Fame.

On 8 September 2015, the city of New York named a street in the Washington Heights district in honor of Kreutzberger, named "Don Francisco Boulevard".

Celebrity advertising
Don Francisco has been in commercials for La Curaçao Department Stores. He was even present for the opening of La Curaçao's South Gate, California and Arizona locations.

He also appears in TV spots for the Mexican telecom company Claro.

In 2010, the U.S. Social Security Administration enlisted Don Francisco to appear in a series of public service announcements to reach out to American Hispanics about the benefits of Social Security.

Lawsuit
In 1992, Kreutzberger was sued by one of his models for sexual harassment, but the suit was settled out of court. There are many pending cases.

References

External links

 
 Teleton Foundation In Chile
 

1940 births
Chilean emigrants to the United States
Chilean Ashkenazi Jews
Chilean people of German-Jewish descent
Chilean philanthropists
Chilean television journalists
Chilean television presenters
Chilean television personalities
Living people
People from Miami
People from Talca
Recipients of the Benemerenti medal
Chilean television talk show hosts